Infinite Moment is the sixth studio album by the Swedish electronic music producer and DJ Axel Willner, under his nickname, The Field. It was released on 21 September 2018 by Kompakt.

Release
On 25 July 2018, Willner announced the release and, in a press release, explained the album. "Hope is something I've been missing in the nowadays climate and this album is a relief to me, a type of comfort, like a moment that feels good and you don't want to end."

The first track to be released, "Who Goes There", was announced on 14 August 2018.

Tour
In support of the album, Willner announced a North American tour of six dates for October 2018.

Critical reception
Infinite Moment was met with "generally favorable" reviews from critics. At Metacritic, which assigns a weighted average rating out of 100 to reviews from mainstream publications, the album received an average score of 80 based on 10 reviews. Aggregator Album of the Year gave the release 77 out of 100 based on a critical consensus of 10 reviews.

Fred Thomas of AllMusic explained, "With one eight-minute exception, the six tracks here stretch out past the ten-minute mark, building so incrementally that their subtle drifting takes on an almost ambient quality. The perpetually unraveling nature of Infinite Moment results in a perfectly paced listening experience that's almost impossible not to get lost in." Daniel Sylvester from Exclaim! gave a rave review for the release, writing, "On Infinite Moment, the Field proves that he's such a master of his craft that he can generate the same excitement from briefly moving outside the box as he can revelling back inside it."

Track listing

Charts

References

2018 albums
The Field (musician) albums
Kompakt albums